Egil Solberg (born 18 April 1949) is a retired Norwegian football striker. He spent his entire career in Mjøndalen, and became league top goalscorer in 1972. Solberg represented Norway as an U21 and senior international.

References

External links
 

1949 births
Living people
Norwegian footballers
Mjøndalen IF players
Norway under-21 international footballers
Norway international footballers
Association football forwards